Narg-e Musa (also Romanized as Nārg-e Mūsá; also known as Nārak Mūsá, Nārj-e Mūsá, and Nārj Mūsā) is a village in Kuh Mareh Khami Rural District, in the Central District of Basht County, Kohgiluyeh and Boyer-Ahmad Province, Iran. At the 2006 census, its population was 179, in 30 families.

References 

Populated places in Basht County